Homeyer is a German surname. Notable people with the surname include:

 Alexander von Homeyer (1834-1903), German soldier and ornithologist
 Eugen Ferdinand von Homeyer (1809-1889), German ornithologist
 Henry Homeyer, American gardening author
 Hilary Homeyer, maiden name of Hilary Lunke, American golfer
 Josef Homeyer (1929-2010), German Roman-catholic Bishop
 Karl Gustav Homeyer (1795-1847), German jurist
 Paul Homeyer (1853-1908), German organist

See also
 Homeier
 Homeyer Verlag Leipzig, a German publishing house

German-language surnames

de:Homeyer